Gavin is a male given name originating from Scotland. It is a variation on the medieval name Gawain, meaning "God send" or "white hawk" (or falcon). Sir Gawain was a knight of King Arthur's Round Table. Sir Gawain and the Green Knight is an epic poem connected with King Arthur's Round Table.
Gawain beheads the Green Knight who promptly replaces his head and threatens Gawain an identical fate the same time next year.
Decapitation figures elsewhere: the Italian name Gavino
 is the name of an early Christian martyr (San Gavino, Porto Torres, Sardinia) who was beheaded in 300 AD, his head being thrown in the Mediterranean Sea only later reunited and interred with his body.

People with the given name

People with the surname 
 Agnes Gavin (1872–1947), Australian actor and screenwriter
 Andy Gavin (born 1970), American programmer
 Barrie Gavin (born 1935), British film director
 Barry Gavin (1944–2017), Australian rules footballer
 Bill Gavin (1907–1985), American radio personality and publisher
 Blair Gavin (born 1989), American soccer player
 Brian Gavin (born 1957), South African diamond cutter
 Brian Gavin (referee) (born 1977), Irish hurling referee
 Buck Gavin (1895–1981), American football player
 Catherine Gavin (1907–2000), Scottish academic historian, war correspondent and historical novelist
 Charles Gavin (born 1960), Brazilian drummer and music producer
 Cy Gavin (born 1985), American artist
 Diarmuid Gavin (born 1964), Irish garden designer and television personality
 Don Gavin, American stand-up comedian and actor
 Enon Gavin (born 1971), Irish Gaelic footballer
 Erica Gavin (born 1947), American actress
 Francis Gavin (born 1962), American political scientist
 Frank Gavin (disambiguation), multiple people
 Frankie Gavin (disambiguation), multiple people
 George Gavin (1810–1880), Irish politician
 James M. Gavin (1907–1991), American general
 Hector Gavin (1815–1855), Scottish physician and sanitarian
 Herb Gavin (1921–2009), United States Army Air Forces test pilot
 Hugh Gavin (1878–1940), Australian rules footballer
 James Gavin (disambiguation), multiple people
 Jamila Gavin  British Indian born author of The Surya Trilogy
 Jason Gavin (disambiguation), multiple people
 Jim Gavin (footballer) (born 1971), Irish Gaelic footballer and manager
 John Gavin (1931–2018), American actor, diplomat, and politician
 John Gavin (disambiguation) or Johnny Gavin, multiple people
 Joseph G. Gavin Jr (1920–2010), American engineer
 Julian Gavin (born 1965), Australian-born British opera singer
 Kelontae Gavin (born 1999), American gospel singer and preacher
 Ken Gavin (1883 – c. 1956), Australian rugby union player
 Kim Gavin, British choreographer
 Leon H. Gavin (1893–1963), American politician
 Mark Gavin (born 1963), Scottish footballer
 Michael Gavin (born 1986), American soccer player
 Natalie Gavin, English actress
 Nigel Gavin, New Zealand musician and composer
 Norman Gavin (1922–2013), English cricketer
 Oliver Gavin (born 1972), British racing driver
 Paddy Gavin (1929–2006), Irish footballer
 Pat Gavin (born 1967), English footballer
 Patrick Gavin, Northern Irish footballer
 Peter Gavin (1847–1931), Canadian merchant and politician
 Peter Gavin (Australian politician) (born 1949), Australian politician
 Robert Gavin (1827–1883), British painter
 Rod Gavin (born 1949), New Zealand canoeist
 Rupert Gavin (born 1953), English businessman
 Stewart Gavin (born 1960), Canadian ice hockey player
 Tim Gavin (born 1963), Australian rugby union player

Fictional characters with the given name
 Gavin Banek, a character in the movie Changing Lanes
 Gavin Belson, a character from the HBO series Silicon Valley
 Gavin Guile, a character from the Lightbringer series by Brent Weeks
 Gavin Mitchell, a character from the Nickelodeon sitcom Drake & Josh
 Gavin Reed, a character from the video game Detroit: Become Human
Gavin Shipman, a character in the BBC sitcom Gavin & Stacey
 Gavin Spinner Mason, a fictional character in Degrassi: The Next Generation
 Gavin Stevens (Faulkner character), a character in several novels by William Faulkner
 Gavin Sullivan, a character in the BBC soap opera EastEnders
 Gavin Volure, a character in the television series 30 Rock
 Gavin Young, the Austin & Ally character
 Gavin Strick, a character in the movie Disturbing Behavior

Fictional characters with the surname
 Teddy Gavin, a character in the television series Rescue Me
 Tommy Gavin, protagonist of the television series Rescue Me
 Kristoph Gavin, a character in the video game Apollo Justice: Ace Attorney
 Klavier Gavin, a prosecutor in the video game Apollo Justice: Ace Attorney

See also 
 Cyclone Gavin, a tropical cyclone of the 1982–83 South Pacific cyclone season
 Gavin Power Plant, a coal-fired power station in Cheshire, Ohio, United States
 Gavan (disambiguation)
 Gavino, related Italian name
 Gavín, Spain

References 

English masculine given names
Scottish masculine given names